The Tugur is a river in the Tuguro-Chumikansky District of Khabarovsk Krai, in the Russian Far East.

Geography
The river originates at the confluence of the rivers  Assyni (Ассыни) and Konin.
It flows into a 30 km wide swampy area  before ending in the Tugur Bay of the Sea of Okhotsk.

Ecology
The Tugur is a good place for fishing, with species such as grayling, lenok, Siberian salmon and northern pike being abundant in its waters and many species spawning in the river. There is also a great variety of wildlife in its banks, with brown bears, Manchurian wapiti, wolves and otters. Among the birds the golden eagle, osprey, mergansers and geese deserve mention.

See also
List of rivers of Russia

References

External links
Рыбалка Тугур; Landscapes of the Tugur River

Rivers of Khabarovsk Krai
Drainage basins of the Sea of Okhotsk